Sam Shepherd, known professionally as Floating Points, is a British electronic music producer, DJ, and musician. He is the founder of Pluto Records, co-founder of Eglo Records and leader of a 16-piece group called Floating Points Ensemble.

Biography
Raised in Manchester, England, Shepherd studied piano at Chetham's School of Music before receiving a PhD in neuroscience and epigenetics at University College London. He also worked as a DJ at Plastic People, a London club, in the late 2000s.

Shepherd's musical influences include Claude Debussy, Olivier Messiaen, and Bill Evans. He began releasing work under the Floating Points moniker in 2008, and in 2017 toured with The xx. Between 2019 and 2020, Shepherd collaborated with jazz saxophonist Pharoah Sanders and The London Symphony Orchestra for the album Promises, which was released on 26 March 2021 to critical acclaim. It was the first major new album released by Sanders in nearly two decades.

He collaborated as a producer for Japanese American singer-songwriter Hikaru Utada album Bad Mode, working on the songs "BAD MODE", "Kibunja Naino (Not In The Mood)" and "Somewhere Near Marseilles".

Floating Points Ensemble
Shepherd has previously performed with a 16-piece live incarnation of Floating Points, entitled the Floating Points Ensemble. The group won an award for "Best BBC Radio 1 Maida Vale Session".

Discography

Studio albums
Elaenia (2015)
Crush (2019)
Promises (with Pharoah Sanders & The London Symphony Orchestra) (2021)

Soundtrack albums
Reflections – Mojave Desert (2017)

Compilation albums
Late Night Tales: Floating Points (2019)

EPs
Vacuum EP (2009)
Shadows EP (2011)
Kuiper (2016)

Singles
"J&W Beat" (2009)
"Love Me Like This" (2009)
"For You" (2009)
"People's Potential" / "Shark Chase" (2010)
"Post Suite" / "Almost in Profile" (2010) (as Floating Points Ensemble)
"Sais (Dub)" (2011)
"Marilyn" (2011)
"Danger" (2011)
"Wires" (2013)
"King Bromeliad" / "Montparnasse" (2014)
"Sparkling Controversy" (2014)
"Nuits Sonores" / "Nectarines" (2014)
"Kuiper" (2016)
"For Marmish Part II" (2016)
"Silurian Blue" (2017)
"Ratio" (2017)
"LesAlpx" (2019)
"Last Bloom" (2019)
"Anasickmodular" (2019)
"Bias" (2020)
"Vocoder" (2022)
"Grammar" (2022)
"Problems" (2022)
"Someone Close" (2022)

References

External links

English electronic musicians
English experimental musicians
Living people
Luaka Bop artists
Musicians from Manchester
Ninja Tune artists
1986 births